Presenting Lena Zavaroni is the fourth album by Scottish singer Lena Zavaroni, released in 1977 by Galaxy Records.

Track listing 
 Whole World in His Hands
 Won't Somebody Dance With Me (De Paul)
 Napony
 As Usual
 Rose, Rose
 Mama Tambu's Wedding
 Speak to Me Pretty
 If It Wasn't For You Dear
 Air Love
 Can't We Make It Go Away
 Say, Has Anybody Seen My Sweet Gypsy Rose (Levine/Brown)
 Pinch Me Am I Dreaming

Personnel 
 Lena Zavaroni – vocals

References

1977 albums
Lena Zavaroni albums